Blancco Ltd.  is an international data security company that specializes in data erasure and computer reuse for corporations, governments and computer remarketing companies. Founded and headquartered in Joensuu, Finland, the company operates from offices across Europe, North America, Middle East, Asia, and Australasia. Blancco is a wholly owned subsidiary of Regenersis, a strategic outsourcing company to consumer technology companies.

Corporation

History
In 1997, Janne Tervo and Kim Väisänen co-founded Carelian Innovation Ltd.  The company's first data erasure product, Blancco Data Cleaner, was released in 1999. Then, in 2000, Carelian Innovations Ltd. changed its name to Blancco Ltd.

Sun Microsystems and Blancco formed a partnership in 2007 to deliver secure and flexible data erasure solutions. In 2007 when Blancco was approved and included in the NATO Information Assurance Product Catalogue (NIAPC). The company expanded its product line in 2008 with the introduction of the Blancco 4.5 client series for added server support, and the Data Center Edition, which enables safe reuse of the hard drives in mass storage environments for clients such as Sun, HP and EMC that need deep data expunging.

The company released Blancco Mobile for smartphone erasure in 2012. In 2011, Blancco LUN was launched and in 2012 Blancco 5 and Management Console 3 were released. The company also acquired DBAN in 2012 and received Common Criteria certification in that same year.

Blancco was acquired by Regenersis in April 2014.

Leadership
Kim Väisänen, Managing Director
Daniel Smith, International Sales Director
Mark Lambton, Financial Director
Sami Tuupanen, Director of Products and Services

Board of directors
Jog Dhody (CFO Regenersis), Chairman
Kim Väisänen, Managing Director

Products
Blancco's data wipe products scale from a single, reusable PC erasure tool to software for erasure requirements in mass storage environments and data centers. The various versions support erasure of different hardware configurations.

Supported hardware erasure

Certifications
Blancco's security certificates and approvals include: Common Criteria (ISO 15408) and Communications Electronics Security Group: United Kingdom Information Technology Group (CESG)

Approvals and recommendations
NATO (listed in the NATO Information Assurance Product Catalogue)

Awards
2013 Strongest Company in Finland of Suomen Asiakastieto Oy
2013 Tivi Company of the Year Award from Tietoviiko ICT Magazine
2012 Company of the Year from Kauppalehti and the OP-Pohjola Group
2012 Ernst & Young Entrepreneur of the Year Award, Finland
2012 President of the Republic of Finland's Internationalization Award

See also
Data erasure
Data remanence
Computer recycling
Data destruction

References

Data security
Computer recycling